The men's 3 metre springboard, also reported as fancy diving, was one of four diving events on the diving at the 1928 Summer Olympics programme. The competition was actually held from both 3 metre and 1 metre boards. Divers performed five compulsory dives from the 3 metre board – running plain header forward, standing backward header, running isander (half gainer), backward spring and forward dive, running header forward with half screw – and six dives of the competitor's choice (different from the compulsory), from either board, for a total of eleven dives. The competition was held from Monday 6 August 1928 to Wednesday 8 August 1928. Twenty-three divers from fifteen nations competed.

Results

First round
A point-for-place system was used to determine qualification for the final. Each of the five judges arrived at a final score for each diver. The diver with the best score from a judge received 1 point, second-best received 2 points, and so on; this process repeated for each judge. The three divers who scored the smallest number of points in each group of the first round advanced to the final.

Group 1

Group 2

Group 3

Final
The Official Report shows both the raw scores and the points determined via the point-for-place system used in the preliminary round. However, neither was used to determine the winners. Instead, the divers were ranked based on how many judges had scored them better than the next diver. Thus, Simaika (13 points) finished behind Galitzen (14 points) because 3 judges had given Galitzen higher scores (placing him 2nd and Simaika 3rd) and 2 judges had given Simaika higher scores (placing him 2nd, Smith 3rd, and Galitzen 4th—causing Galitzen to have a higher point-for-place score).

References

Sources
 
 

Men
1928
Men's events at the 1928 Summer Olympics